Wild Things is an American series of films created by Stephen Peters.

Films

Wild Things (1998)

In south Florida, a high school counselor is accused of rape by a manipulative rich girl and her trailer trash classmate. The cop on the case begins to suspect a conspiracy and dives into an elaborate and devious web of greed and betrayal to find the truth.

Wild Things 2 (2004)

An insurance investigator follows two young women who scheme to inherit millions of dollars.

Wild Things: Diamonds in the Rough (2005)

Two young women will stop at nothing for one to gain a $4 million inheritance of two priceless diamonds, while two detectives try to thwart their plans, but find complications abound.

Wild Things: Foursome (2010)

A murdered millionaire's son finds himself tangled up in a game of seduction and murder after a raunchy night with three beautiful women.

Cast and crew

Principal cast
Key
A dark gray cell indicates the character was not in the film.

Additional crew and production details

Cancelled sequel
In February 2006, it was reported that Neve Campbell and Denise Richards would appear in Backstabbers, and producers were trying to get more of the original film's cast to star as well.  Although Backstabbers would have reportedly reunited members of the cast and crew of Wild Things, it would not have been a sequel. Backstabbers never saw release.

References

External links
 
 
 
 
 
 
 
 

Film series introduced in 1998
Stage 6 Films franchises
American film series
Tetralogies